Tracy Quan (born August 15, 1977) is an American writer and former sex worker. She is best known for her Nancy Chan novels. In addition, Quan has written a regular column for The Guardian website on pop culture, sex and politics and is involved in the prostitutes' rights movement.

Biography
Quan was born in the Northeastern US, but grew up in Canada. Her parents emigrated to the US from Trinidad; she has spoken of Chinese, Indian, African, and Dutch ancestors. Her parents divorced, and she credits her close relationship to her father to this experience.

Quan read Xaviera Hollander's book The Happy Hooker when she was ten years old and decided to be a prostitute. (Her prior aspiration, to be a librarian, was due to her image of librarians as independent, working women who got to collect money in the form of library fines.) By 19 she was supporting herself as a sex worker, working at an escort agency and a house before becoming an independent call girl with her own client list. As she told CANOE magazine in 2005, "I was never on the street. I've had a relatively easy time." Quan notes she spent 15 years as a working girl in London and Manhattan, although she juggled both writing and sex work for a few years.

As a writer, Quan first made a splash with her Nancy Chan: Diary of a Manhattan Call Girl column in Salon.com. Combining sex with a twice-weekly serial, the semi-autobiographical column centered on Nancy as she juggles her 'straight' boyfriend and family with her clients and girlfriends' problems. The story continues in the novels. Quan expresses the emotional aspects of her life experiences in her novels, her fiction writing, and keeps her journalism for professional commentary on topics of interest: the plight of sex trade workers, changing sexual mores, topical media frenzies on public personalities such as the Eliot Spitzer scandal. Quan is currently a full-time writer, has been a columnist for The Guardian website and is a contributor to The Daily Beast. In 2010, Quan was a semifinalist for the 3 Quarks Daily Politics Prize, judged by Lewis Lapham. She has become a frequent guest on Morning Brew, a Radio 3
RTHK weekday breakfast show hosted by Phil Whelan, commenting on current events and social media.

Philosophical and/or political views
Quan served as a spokeswoman for Prostitutes of New York, or PONY, a sex workers advocacy organization. Quan has been described as a "libertarian entrepreneur", who advocates decriminalization of prostitution in the US. At the same time, she does not encourage others to go into the business.

Notes

Works

Nancy Chan
Nancy Chan: Diary of a Manhattan Call Girl ran in Salon.com from July 1999-January 2000 as a twice-weekly serial.
working link
Diary of a Manhattan Call Girl (2001) . Despite name similarity, the events in this novel are set after the Salon series.
Diary of a Married Call Girl: A Nancy Chan Novel (2005) 
Diary of a Jetsetting Call Girl (2008)  An adventure in southern France involving the relics of Mary Magdalen

Other
Orientalia: Sex in Asia (2003) (With photographer Reagan Louie.) 
Prostitution and Pornography: Philosophical Debate About the Sex Industry Edited by Jessica Spector (2006)

External links
Official Tracy Quan site
Op-ed column by Quan New York Times
Columns by Tracy Quan in The Guardian
Tracy Quan sex advice column in Salon.com
Court TV Online - Chat transcript is no longer available
Author Podcast Interview with Paula Shackleton BookBuffet.com
Articles by Tracy Quan in The Daily Beast
3QD Politics Prize Semifinalists 2010

Living people
American expatriates in Canada
American women writers of Indian descent
American people of Chinese descent
American people of Dutch descent
American people of Trinidad and Tobago descent
American prostitutes
Individualist feminists
Sex worker activists in the United States
African-American writers
1977 births
21st-century African-American people
21st-century African-American women
20th-century African-American people
20th-century African-American women
African-American women writers